O2O can refer to :

 Online to offline marketing. (also Offline to online)   

 Orion Artemis II Optical Communications System, using laser communications to Earth from lunar orbit.